Md. Sekandar Badsha Bulbul (known as Badsha Bulbul; born 20 February 1964) is a Bangladeshi musician of modern and folk genre.

Early life 
MD Sekandar Badshah Bulbul was born in Pabna District. His mother Monowara is a singer. His two sisters Doly Sayontoni and Poly Sayontoni are also singers in profession.

Badshah Bulbul was born in Pabna District. In addition to modern songs, he has gained considerable popularity in folk songs. Raised from a cultured family, his mother was famous for the famous lalanagiti, palligiti, bhavaiya and murshidi songs. He got the handcuffs of the song from his mother. Badsha Bulbul has won numerous awards including the National Children's Award for the song. Recently, one afternoon, this popular musician of Bengali music came to the fortnightly Prabas Mela office. Talked about how the song came about. He met the executive editor of Prabas Mela on various issues of the present time. The magnetic part of the conversation is highlighted for the readers.

King Bulbul started singing at a very young age. Asked when and how he started singing, Badsha Bulbul said, "My mother Monowara Begum used to sing." He used to do folk music. I would listen and sing while he sang. Then I will be 5 or 6 years old. One day my mother said, "Bulbul, why are you singing from afar? Come, bring the harmonium." My mother then taught me to clean my feet and sing Sa Re Ga Ma.

He said that at that time there was a music festival in our house every Thursday. Baul artists and folk artists from different parts of Rajshahi, Kushtia and Pabna used to participate in the program. His mother learned music from Ustad MA Gafur and Delwar Hossain. 
Badsha Bulbul said, “My mother was the first female artist to perform Lalon Sangeet on Rajshahi Betar in 1972. For a long time he has regularly performed Lalon Giti and Palligiti on Bangladesh Betar, Bangladesh Television. One of the most popular musicians in Bengali music is Dolly Sayantani and Polly Sayantani is the sister of Badsha Bulbul.

In response to a question, Badsha Bulbul said, "I sang with my mother in 1963 on the first stage show at Ishwardi in Pabna." In 1978, on the World Children's Day, I received the Consolation Prize for singing. Then in 1979 and 1980, Badsha Bulbul won the National Child Artist Award as a child artist. He received the award from Banga Bhaban from the then President Ziaur Rahman and after receiving the National Award in 1979, he officially visited India, Sri Lanka, Pakistan and Nepal with about 12 people including Diti, Saberi Alam, Molly, magician Ahsan Habib. He met Pakistan's popular heroes and heroines Mohammad Ali and Zeba. Badsha Bulbul has received Bangladesh Film Journalists Association (Bacchus) Award 2005, C, C, A Award 2005, R, TV, Award 2014 and many more.

Career 
Bulbul debuted his stage performance in 1981. In 1991, he started singing at Bangladesh Television. In 1994, he released his first song album.

Professionally, Bulbul's musical career began in 1981 with a stage show. His first album, Milton Khandaker's song 'Near the Book' was released in 1986. However, the album was not very popular at that time due to the flood of 7s across the country. Then in 1995, Milton Khandaker's album 'She Jeno Chiro Sukhi Hoye' was released and became very popular. Originally, he came to the limelight through the song of that album ‘That black-crowned tree is not dead yet, as much hope of the mind is dead’Later, Pranab Ghosh, Mannan Mohammad, Ali Akbar Rupu, Ayub Bachchu, Bari Siddiqui, Ajmir Babu, Hasan Matiur Rahman, Mostaq Ahmed, Farid Ahmed, Ibrar Tipu sang innumerable songs to their tune. In 2016, Badsha Bulbul's music video 'Chadmukhe Chandni Hasi' was released and it also gained immense popularity.

He has released about 18 solo albums and more than 150 mixed albums. He has also sung in numerous films. He has worked with Alauddin Ali, Shawkat Ali Emon, Shuvo, Alam Khan, Mostaq Ahmed. He said his songs can be heard on 108 digital media.n Mentioned YouTube, Amazon, Spotify, iTunes, Revivalization, SoundCloud, Dizar and CD Baby etc. In 1991, he was listed as an artist on BTV. Since then ATN Bangla, Channel I, Asian TV, Bangla Bhishan, R TV, Desh TV, Gazi TV, E TV, Gaan Bangla, regular Badsha Bulbul have been programming solo and he has sung live on Bangla TV and S TV in London.

Badsha Bulbul has sung in numerous albums including 'She was my darling', 'Let her be happy forever', 'Poetry of heart', 'Still love comes',' Broken mind ',' Who made me sad ',' Heart ',' I will forget you ',' Mohana ',' I wanted to forget ',' Ekonme hailona Piriti ',' Ekdin Sandhya ',' Piriti is not for me '‘Pain Shravan’, ‘Ami Asboi’ etc. are notable.In response to a question about doing stage shows in different countries, Badsha Bulbul said, "I have participated in many shows organized by expatriate Bangladeshis in different countries for many years. Especially I have sung in front of expatriate Bangladeshis in many countries including Oman, Dubai, Qatar, Hong Kong, Japan, London, Italy, France, Germany, Greece, Uzbekistan, America, Canada. I like to sing in front of them, I like it a lot. While singing in front of them, I feel like I am singing in my own house. Everyone feels very close. The love and sincerity that I get then is not like expressing in words. '

At present, he has a vocal presence on almost all channels, including music programs and stage shows. Asked about his future plans, the musician said, "I have planned to remix his original songs in the past." He also said that building a big academy for music in the future is the biggest dream of his life. That is why he has started work, said Badsha Bulbul. In response to the question of what is the best achievement of life, this talented artist said, the love of the listeners is the best achievement of our life. I would not be able to come to this stage today without their support and love. I am grateful to all the audience.

He has done stage shows in different countries including London with many popular stars including legendary actor of Bangladesh Razzak, King Khan of Dhaliwood and famous Shakib Khan. King Bulbul often visits Fobana in Canada and various community programs in the United States.

PROBASH MELA
NOVEMBER 27,2019

Works
Albums
 Shey Chilo Amar Priyotoma
 Shukhi Hote Chai Na
 Bhulte Cheyecchilam
 Bhule Jabo Ami Tomake 
 Hridoyer Kobita
 Tobuo Prem Acche 
 Bhanga Mon
 Je Amay Dukkho Dilo 
 Ontore
 Mohona
 Ek Jonome Hoilona Piriti
 Ekdin Sondhay 
 Piriti Amar Jonno Noy 
 Bathar Shrabon 
 Ami Ashboi

Awards
 National Children's Award Competition (Folk Music) (1979) 1st Prize 
 National Children's Award Competition (Folk Music) (1980) 1st Prize
 Jury Special Prize from Bangladesh Film Journalists Association Bachsas Awards (2005)

References

External links 
 

Living people
1964 births
People from Pabna District
20th-century Bangladeshi male singers
20th-century Bangladeshi singers
21st-century Bangladeshi male singers
21st-century Bangladeshi singers